Francis Joseph Carr (21 April 1919 – July 2010) was an English professional footballer who played as an inside forward in the Football League for York City, and was on the books of Rotherham United without making a league appearance.

References

1919 births
People from Maltby, South Yorkshire
2010 deaths
English footballers
Association football forwards
Rotherham United F.C. players
York City F.C. players
English Football League players
Footballers from Yorkshire